Leon Chwistek (Kraków, Austria-Hungary, 13 June 1884 – Barvikha near Moscow, Russia, 20 August 1944) was a Polish avant-garde painter, theoretician of modern art, literary critic, logician, philosopher and mathematician.

Career and philosophy
In 1919 he was one of the founders of the Polish Mathematical Society. From 1922, he lectured in mathematics for natural scientists at the Jagiellonian University, where he obtained his habilitation in 1928 in mathematical logic.

Starting in 1929, Chwistek was a Professor of Logic at the University of Lwów in a position for which Alfred Tarski had also applied. His interests in the 1930s were in a general system of philosophy of science, which was published in a book translated in English 1948 as The Limits of Science.

In the 1920s–30s, many European philosophers attempted to reform traditional philosophy by means of mathematical logic. Leon Chwistek did not believe that such reform could succeed. He thought that reality could not be described in one homogeneous system, based on the principles of formal logic, because there was not one reality but many.

After the outbreak of World War II and the occupation of Lviv by the USSR, he remained at the university. He also started cooperation with Czerwony Sztandar. In September 1940, he joined the Union of Soviet Writers of Ukraine. In June 1941, just before the entry of the German troops, he evacuated from Lviv together with the Soviet troops deep into Russia. From 1941 to 1943, he lived in Tbilisi, where he taught mathematical analysis, and from 1943 in Moscow. He was active in the Union of Polish Patriots in the USSR.

Chwistek argued against the axiomatic method by demonstrating that the extant axiomatic systems are inconsistent.

Artist
Chwistek developed his theory of the multiplicity of realities first with regard to the arts. He distinguished four basic types of realities, then matched them with four basic types of painting.

The four types of realities were:
1. popular reality (common-sense realism)
2. physical reality (constructed by physics)
3. phenomenal reality (sensory impressions)
4. visionary/intuitive reality (dreams, hallucinations, subconscious states).

The types of painting corresponding to the above were:
1. Primitivism
2. Realism
3. Impressionism
4. Futurism
Chwistek never intended his views to constitute a new metaphysical theory. He was a defender of "common sense" against metaphysics and irrational feeling. His theory of plural reality was merely an attempt to specify the various ways in which the term, “real,” is used.
 
Chwistek's fellow artist and closest friend, Stanislaw Ignacy Witkiewicz, harshly criticized his  philosophical views.  Witkiewicz's own philosophy was based on a monadic character to the individual's existence, embracing a multiplicity of existences, with the world being made up of a multiplicity of Particular Existences.

Works
 The limits of science. Outline of logic and of the methodology of the exact sciences. Translated from the Polish by Helen Charlotte Brodie and Arthur P. Coleman; introduction and appendix by Helen Charlotte Brodie. New York: Harcourt, Brace, 1948

See also
 History of philosophy in Poland
 List of Poles

References

External links 

  Profile of Leon Chwistek at Culture.pl
 Instituto Polaco de Cultura: Artola, Inés R. (2015), Formiści: la síntesis de la modernidad (1917 – 1922). Conexiones y protagonistas, Granada: Libargo, 

1884 births
1944 deaths
Artists from Kraków
Polish logicians
Polish mathematicians
20th-century Polish painters
20th-century Polish male artists
Polish male painters
20th-century Polish philosophers
World War II refugees